Imola Grand Prix may refer to:

 City of Imola motorcycle Grand Prix
 1963 Imola Grand Prix, a non-championship Formula One race
 San Marino Grand Prix, held at the Autodromo Internazionale Enzo e Dino Ferrari and sometimes referred to as the Imola Grand Prix
 Emilia Romagna Grand Prix, also held at the Autodromo Internazionale Enzo e Dino Ferrari and sometimes referred to as the Imola Grand Prix

See also 
 Autodromo Internazionale Enzo e Dino Ferrari, often called the Imola Circuit